Carme Elías i Boada (born 14 January 1951) is a Spanish film actress.

Selected filmography

References

External links 
 

Spanish film actresses
1951 births
Living people
Actresses from Barcelona
Best Actress Goya Award winners
20th-century Spanish actresses
21st-century Spanish actresses